Calvin DeWitt Paige (May 20, 1848 – April 24, 1930) was a U.S. Representative from Massachusetts.

He was born in Southbridge, Massachusetts. He was president of the Central Cotton Mills Company, the Southbridge Savings Bank and the Edwards Company.

Political career
He served as a member of the state house of representatives in 1878 and 1879, he was delegate to the Republican National Convention in 1884, and a member of the Governor's council in 1906 and 1907.

He was elected as a Republican to the Sixty-third Congress by special election, after the death of representative William H. Wilder, and reelected to the five succeeding Congresses from 1913 to 1925.

After leaving congress, he withdrew from public life, and engaged in banking in Southbridge.

See also
 1878 Massachusetts legislature

External links
 

1848 births
1930 deaths
Republican Party members of the Massachusetts House of Representatives
People from Southbridge, Massachusetts
Republican Party members of the United States House of Representatives from Massachusetts